Marjan Manček (born 3 January 1948) is a Slovene illustrator, cartoonist and animator. He has illustrated over 190 books and is himself also the author of 30 children's picture books and comics. He also produced a number of short animated films.

Manček was born in Novo Mesto in 1948. He studied English and History at the University of Ljubljana, but mostly worked as a free-lance caricaturist, illustrator and film animator. In 2007 he won the Levstik Awardfor lifetime achievement in illustration.

References

Slovenian illustrators
Slovenian caricaturists
Slovenian comics artists
Slovenian children's book illustrators
Living people
1948 births
People from Novo Mesto
Levstik Award laureates
University of Ljubljana alumni